Fauver Frank Mendes Braga (born 14 September 1994), commonly known as Fauver, is a Brazilian footballer who currently plays as a midfielder.

Career statistics

Club

Notes

References

External links
Fauver at ZeroZero

1994 births
Living people
Brazilian footballers
Brazilian expatriate footballers
Association football midfielders
Esporte Clube Bahia players
Rio Branco Esporte Clube players
Gyeongnam FC players
Toledo Esporte Clube players
Ansan Greeners FC players
Ferroviário Atlético Clube (CE) players
CE Operário Várzea-Grandense players
Associação Esportiva Velo Clube Rioclarense players
Santa Cruz Futebol Clube players
K League 2 players
Brazilian expatriate sportspeople in South Korea
Expatriate footballers in South Korea
Footballers from São Paulo